Mosquero is a village in Harding and San Miguel counties in the U.S. state of New Mexico. The population was 93 at the 2010 census, down from 120 in 2000. It is the county seat of Harding County; only a small portion of the village extends into San Miguel County.

Geography
Mosquero is located at  (35.776293, -103.957133). New Mexico State Road 39 passes through the village, leading southeast  to Logan and northwest  to Roy.

Demographics

As of the census of 2000, there were 120 people, 60 households, and 33 families residing in the village. The population density was 120.8 people per square mile (2.58/km). There were 86 housing units at an average density of 86.5 per square mile (33.5/km). The racial makeup of the village was 70.00% White, 25.83% from other races, and 4.17% from two or more races. Hispanic or Latino of any race were 77.50% of the population.

There were 60 households, out of which 16.7% had children under the age of 18 living with them, 45.0% were married couples living together, 8.3% had a female householder with no husband present, and 45.0% were non-families. 41.7% of all households were made up of individuals, and 23.3% had someone living alone who was 65 years of age or older. The average household size was 2.00 and the average family size was 2.76.

In the village, the population was spread out, with 17.5% under the age of 18, 4.2% from 18 to 24, 20.0% from 25 to 44, 31.7% from 45 to 64, and 26.7% who were 65 years of age or older. The median age was 51 years. For every 100 females, there were 114.3 males. For every 100 females age 18 and over, there were 110.6 males.

The median income for a household in the village was $25,000, and the median income for a family was $32,917. Males had a median income of $19,167 versus $16,250 for females. The per capita income for the village was $11,915. There were 14.6% of families and 21.6% of the population living below the poverty line, including 41.4% of under eighteens and 22.2% of those over 64.

Notable person
 Donald Enlow, orthodontics scientist

Gallery

See also

References

External links

Villages in Harding County, New Mexico
Villages in San Miguel County, New Mexico
Villages in New Mexico
County seats in New Mexico